Moses Witbooi (1808 – 22 February 1888, Gibeon, Namibia) was the second chief of the Witbooi Nama or ǀKhowesin, a ruling clan of the Oorlam branch of the Nama people. He was the son of Kido Witbooi, founder of the clan. He became the de facto leader in 1870, but official chief only at his father's death on 31 December 1875. In the 1880s, he allied with Jan Jonker Afrikaner against the Herero people. Late in 1887 he was deposed by his son-in-law Paul Visser, who had him executed early the next year. His son Hendrik Witbooi soon after killed Visser and reunited the Oorlam under his rule.

References

1808 births
1888 deaths
Oorlam people
Namibian chiefs